This is a timeline documenting the events of heavy metal in the year 1986.

Newly formed bands

24-7 Spyz
Accuser
Acid Drinkers
Agressor
Ahat
Anacrusis 
Angkor Wat 
Atrophy
Baton Rouge
Believer 
Black Obelisk  
Bolt Thrower
Bonfire 
Brutality  
Cacophony
Cerebral Fix
Circus of Power
Cold 
Confessor 
Cycle Sluts from Hell 
Darkthrone
DBC (Dead Brain Cells)
Demolition Hammer
Despair
Dreamscape 
Elegy
Evildead
Front Line Assembly
Grave
Immolation
Infernäl Mäjesty
Invocator
IronChrist
Katedra 
La Pestilencia
M.O.D.
Mana Mana
Manic Street Preachers
Manitoba's Wild Kingdom
Massacra
Mastermind 
McAuley Schenker Group
Merciless
Mezarkabul
Mortem
Mucky Pup
Nelson
Nuclear Death
OLD
Opprobrium
Paradox 
Pestilence
Prong
Revelation
Risk
Salty Dog
Scanner 
Sinawe 
Skid Row
Sugar Ray
Terrorizer
Trauma 
Treponem Pal 
Unseen Terror
Vain
Vanden Plas
Viking 
Waltari
XYZ

Albums & EPs

 Aaronsrod - Illusions Kill
 Abattoir - The Only Safe Place
 Accept - Russian Roulette
 AC/DC - Who Made Who (soundtrack to Maximum Overdrive)
 ADX – La Terreur
 Alcatrazz - Dangerous Games
 Alice Cooper - Constrictor
 Alien Force - Pain and Pleasure
 Angel Dust – Into the Dark Past
 Angel Witch – Frontal Assault
 Anthem - Tightrope
 Asgard - In the Ancient Days
 Atomkraft – Queen of Death (EP)
 Attila – Rolling Thunder
 At War - Ordered to Kill
 Axtion – Live (EP)
 Baby Tuckoo - Force Majeure
 Bad Brains - I Against I
 Banshee - Cry in the Night (EP)
 Barren Cross - Rock for the King
 Beowülf - Beowülf
 Bitches Sin – Invaders
 Billy Idol – Whiplash Smile
 Black Fate - Commander of Fate
 Black Ice - Hot-N-Heavy (EP)
 Black 'n Blue - Nasty Nasty
 Black Rose – Walk It How You Talk It
 Black Sabbath - Seventh Star 
 Blacksmith – Blacksmith (EP)
 Blade Runner – Warriors of Rock
 Bloodgood - Bloodgood
 Blood Money – Red Raw And Bleeding!
 Bonfire - Don't Touch the Light
 Bon Jovi - Slippery When Wet
 Bride -  Show No Mercy
 Britny Fox - In America (EP)
 The Brood - The Brood
 Burning Starr - No Turning Back
 Candlemass - Epicus Doomicus Metallicus
 Castle Blak - Another Dark Carneval
 Carrion – Evil Is There
 Cerberus - Too Late to Pray
 Chariot - Burning Ambition
 Charon – Made In Aluminium
 Chastain - Ruler of the Wasteland
 Child'ƨ Play - Ruff House (EP)
 Cinderella - Night Songs
 Cirith Ungol - One Foot in Hell
 Cities - Annihilation Absolute 
 CJSS - World Gone Mad
 CJSS - Praise the Loud
 Cloven Hoof – Fighting Back (live)
 Cobra (UK) – Back From the Dead
 Crimson Glory - Crimson Glory
 Cro-Mags - The Age of Quarrel
 Crumbsuckers - Life of Dreams
 Cryptic Slaughter - Convicted
 Damien Throne - The Sign of the Jackal
 Dark Angel - Darkness Descends
 D.C. Lacroix - Crack of Doom
 Deaf Dealer - Keeper of the Flame
 Dealer – First Strike
 Death Row - Riders of Doom, aka Satan's Gift
 Deep Switch - Nine Inches of God
 Demon - Demon (EP)
 Desolation Angels - Desolation Angels
 Destruction - Eternal Devastation
 Detente - Recognize No Authority
 Diamond - Diamond
 Diamond Rexx - Land of the Damned
 Paul Di'Anno's Battlezone – Fighting Back
 Dio - Intermission (live)
 Dirty Looks – In Your Face
 Dr. Mastermind - Dr. Mastermind
 Earthshaker - Overrun
 Easy Action – That Makes One
 Eden - Eden
 Elektradrive - ...Over the Space
 Elixir - The Son of Odin
 Emerald - Armed For Battle
 Europe - The Final Countdown
 Excess - Melting Point
 Exciter - Unveiling the Wicked
 Exorcist - Nightmare Theater
 Faithful Breath - Live
 Fastway - Trick or Treat
 Fates Warning - Awaken the Guardian
 Fifth Angel - Fifth Angel
 Firstryke - Just A Nightmare
 Flatbacker - Esa
 Flotsam and Jetsam - Doomsday for the Deceiver
 Force - Set Me Free
 Forever – Forever & Ever
 Foreplay - Hot 'N Heavy (EP)
 Formel 1 - Live im Stahlwerk 
 Girlschool - Nightmare at Maple Cross
 Giuffria - Silk + Steel
 Grave Digger - War Games
 Gravestone – Creating a Monster
 Digger (Grave Digger) - Stronger Than Ever
 Great White - Shot in the Dark
 Griffin - Protector of the Lair
 Guns N' Roses - Live ?!*@ Like a Suicide (EP)
 Hallowed - Hallowed
 Hallows Eve - Death & Insanity
 Hammeron – Nothin' To Do But Rock
 Have Mercy - Armageddon Descends (EP)
 Hawk - Hawk
 Heir Apparent - Graceful Inheritance
 Helstar - Remnants of War
 Heretic - Torture Knows No Boundary (EP)
 Hexx - Under the Spell
 High Power - Les Violons de Satan
 Hirax - Hate, Fear and Power
 Holy Moses - Queen of Siam
 Hurricane - Take What You Want
 Hyde (CA) - Hyde
 Impaler - If We Had Brains... We'd Be Dangerous!
 Iron Angel - Winds of War
 Iron Maiden - Somewhere in Time
 Jesters of Destiny - Fun at the Funeral 
 Judas Priest - Turbo
 Juggernaut - Baptism Under Fire
 Kat - Metal and Hell
 Kat - 666
 Keel - The Final Frontier 
 Kick Axe - Rock the World
 Killer (Swi) - Young Blood
 Killer Dwarfs - Stand Tall
 Killers (Fra) - Danger de Vie
 King Diamond - Fatal Portrait
 King Kobra - Thrill of a Lifetime
 Krank - Hideous 
 Kreator - Pleasure to Kill
 Krokus - Change of Address
 Krokus - Alive and Screamin' (live)
 Kuni - Masque 
 Letchen Grey - Party Politics (EP)
 Lion - Power Love (EP)
 Living Death - Back to the Weapons (EP)
 Lizzy Borden - The Murderous Metal Roadshow (live)
 Lizzy Borden - Menace to Society
 London - Don't Cry Wolf
 Loudness – 8186 Live
 Loudness - Lightning Strikes
 M.A.R.S. - Project: Driver
 Tony MacAlpine - Edge of Insanity
 Mad Reign - Mad Reign (EP)
 Manilla Road - The Deluge
 Malisha - Serve Your Savage Beast
 Yngwie Malmsteen - Trilogy
 Frank Marino – Full Circle
 Martyr (Hol) - Darkness at Time's Edge
 Mass (Ger) - Kick Your Ass!
 Medieval - Medieval (EP)
 Megadeth - Peace Sells... But Who's Buying?
 Megattack - Raw Delivery
 Mekong Delta - Mekong Delta
 Messiah Prophet - Master of the Metal
 Metal Priest - Bursting Out
 Metal Church - The Dark
 Metal Massacre - Metal Massacre VII (Compilation, various artists)
 Metallica - Master of Puppets
 Michael W. Smith - The Big Picture
 Militia - The Sybling (EP)
 Mindless Sinner - Turn on the Power
 Mistrust - Spin the World
 Vinnie Moore – Mind's Eye
 Mortal Sin - Mayhemic Destruction
 Motörhead - Orgasmatron
 Nightwing – VI 
 Nuclear Assault - Brain Death (EP)
 Nuclear Assault - Game Over
 Obsession - Scarred for Life
 Obús - Dejarse la piel
 Omen - The Curse
 Onslaught - The Force
 Orphan Allies – Running From the Law
 Outside - Magic Sacrifice 
 Ozzy Osbourne - The Ultimate Sin
 Oz - ...Decibel Storm...
 Pain - Insanity
 Panther - Panther (EP)
 Persian Risk - Rise Up
 Phantom Lord - Evil Never Sleeps
 Picture - Every Story Needs Another Picture
 Piledriver - Stay Ugly
 Poison - Look What the Cat Dragged In
 Possessed - Beyond the Gates
 Post Mortem  – Coroner's Office
 Powerlord - The Awakening
 Powermad - Powermad (EP)
 Predator - Easy Prey
 Preyer – Terminator
 Queen - A Kind of Magic
 Queensrÿche - Rage for Order
 Quiet Riot - QR III
 Racer X - Street Lethal
 Rage - Reign of Fear
 Rankelson – Hungry For Blood
 Ratt - Dancing Undercover
 Ravage - Wrecking Ball
 Raven - The Pack Is Back
 Raven - Mad (EP)
 Razor - Malicious Intent
 Renegade - Renegade
 Ripper - ...And the Dead Shall Rise
 Rhoads - Into the Future
 Rock Goddess - Young & Free
 Canedy, Feinstein, Bordonaro & Caudle - Hollywood
 The Rods - Heavier Than Thou
 Rogue Male - Animal Man
 Rough Cutt - Wants You!
 David Lee Roth - Eat 'Em and Smile
 Ruthless - Discipline of Steel
 Sabbrabells - Sailing On the Revenge
 Sabotage - Behind the Lines
 Sacred Blade - Of The Sun + Moon
 Sacred Rite - Is Nothing Sacred?
 Sacrifice - Torment in Fire
 Sadus - D.T.P.
 Saint - Time's End
 Saint Vitus - Born Too Late
 Samhain - Samhain III: November-Coming-Fire
 Samson - Joint Forces
 Samson - Head Tactics (comp) 
 Samurai – Weapon Master
 Satan - Into the Future (EP)
 Satan's Host - Metal from Hell
 Joe Satriani - Not of This Earth
 Savage Grace - After the Fall from Grace
 Savatage - Fight for the Rock
 Sentinel Beast - Depths of Death
 Sepultura - Morbid Visions
 Shark Island -  S'cool Buss
 Silver Mountain - Hibiya: Live in Japan '85 
 Sinner - Comin' Out Fighting
 Slaughter (Can) – Strappado
 Slayer - Reign in Blood
 Snake - Let The Music Begin
 Sodom - Obsessed by Cruelty
 Sortilège - Larmes de Héros
 Sound Barrier - Speed of Light
 Steel Angel – Kiss of Steel
 Steel Crown - Sunset Warriors
 Steeler (Ger) - Strike Back
 St. Elmo's Fire – St. Elmo's Fire
 Stone Fury - Let Them Talk
 Stormwitch - Stronger Than Heaven
 Stryper - To Hell with the Devil
 Sword - Metalized
 Syron Vanes – Revenge
 Talon - Vicious Game
 Tankard - Zombie Attack
 Tarot - Spell of Iron
 Tension - Breaking Point
 Tesla - Mechanical Resonance
 Thor - Recruits – Wild in the Streets
 Thor - The Edge of Hell
 TKO - Below the Belt
 Tormé – Back To Babylon
 Touched – Death Row
 Treat - The Pleasure Principle
 Tredegar - Tredegar
 Trilogy (Aus) - Next in Line (in EU); Saracen - Saracen (in Aus)
 Triumph - The Sport of Kings
 TT Quick - Metal of Honor
 Turbo - Kawaleria Szatana
 Tyga Mira – Deliverance
 Tygers of Pan Tang – First Kill (comp)
 Tyran' Pace - Watching You
 Tyrant (Ger) - Running Hot
 Tysondog - Crimes of Insanity
 V.V.S.I. - No Ace at Hand
 Vanadium – Born to Fight
 Van Halen - 5150
 Vardis - Vigilante
 Vengeance - We Have Ways to Make You Rock
 Venom - Eine Kleine Nachtmusik
 Victim - Dirty, Mean & Nasty (EP)
 Victory - Don't Get Mad... Get Even
 Villain - Only Time Will Tell (EP)
 Vinnie Vincent Invasion - Vinnie Vincent Invasion
 Voivod - Rrröööaaarrr
 Vow Wow - III
 Vulcain - Big Brothers
 W.A.S.P. - Inside the Electric Circus
 Warhead (Bel) - The Day After
 Warlock - True as Steel
 Waysted - Save Your Prayers
 Wendy O. Williams - Kommander of Kaos
 Whiplash - Power and Pain
 White Tiger - White Tiger
 Wrath - Fit of Anger
 X-Caliber - Warriors of the Night
 Zebra – 3.V
 Zero Nine – Intrigue
 Znöwhite - Live Suicide 
 Zodiac Mindwarp - High Priest of Love (EP)

Events
 Living Colour's line-up is solidified to a quartet, consisting of Corey Glover (vocals), Vernon Reid (guitar), Muzz Skillings (bass), and Will Calhoun (drums).
 Phil Lynott, the former frontman of Thin Lizzy, dies at the age of 36 on January 4 from drug-related health problems.
 Metallica's third album Master of Puppets peaks at #29 on the Billboard 200, spending 72 weeks on the charts with minor radio airplay. Unfortunately, bassist Cliff Burton dies aged 24 on September 27 in a bus accident in Sweden.  Jason Newsted from Phoenix band Flotsam and Jetsam is hired after auditions are held.
 Metal Hammer magazine is first published.
 Slayer's third album Reign in Blood peaks at 94 on the Billboard 200 with no radio airplay. The album also reached number 47 on the UK Album Chart,[14] and on November 20, 1992, it was certified gold in the United States. Kerrang! magazine described it as the "heaviest album of all time,"[16] while Metal Hammer magazine named it "the best metal album of the last 20 years."[17] 
 Jeff "Mantas" Dunn leaves British band Venom to pursue a solo career.

1980s in heavy metal music
Metal